Targus may refer to:

 Anastasia Targus, a character in the TV series Star Trek: Borg
 Targus (corporation), a company that makes computer accessories
 Targus, a planet in the role-playing game Star Hero RPG world

See also 
 Târgu Mureș, a Romanian city
 Târgu Jiu, a Romanian city